Huang Feihu is a fictional character in the Chinese epic fantasy novel Fengshen Bang. Originally known as Prince Wucheng of the Shang Dynasty, he defects to Xiqi (西岐; the precursor to the Zhou Dynasty), a vassal state under Shang, after the tyrannical King Zhou of Shang caused the death of his wife. He brings along his two younger brothers, three sons, four close friends, and hundreds of followers loyal to him. Huang Feihu later participates in the campaign led by King Wu of the Zhou Dynasty to overthrow King Zhou of Shang. He is killed in action during a battle against the Shang general Zhang Kui (張奎).

Biography 
Huang Feihu is born in a family of officials who have served the Shang Dynasty for seven generations. Huang Feihu's father Huang Gun is a Shang general tasked with defending the border. Huang Feihu himself is granted the title of "Prince Wucheng Who Guards the Kingdom" (鎮國武成王; usually shortened to "Prince Wucheng"). Huang Feihu's younger sister, Consort Huang, is also a concubine of King Zhou, the last ruler of the Shang Dynasty.

Near the end of the Shang Dynasty, King Zhou becomes obsessed with his concubine Daji, who is actually a vixen spirit in disguise as a woman. King Zhou is a ruthless and bloodthirsty tyrant who uses cruel means to torture and kill those who oppose him, including his own ministers who dared to speak up to him. At one point, King Zhou lusts for Huang Feihu's wife, Lady Jia, and attempts to seize her for himself. Lady Jia commits suicide to preserve her dignity. Consort Huang scolds King Zhou for his wicked ways and the king kills her by throwing her off Zhaixing Tower in anger.

Huang Feihu is furious when he learns the truth and he defects to Xiqi (西岐; the precursor to the Zhou Dynasty), a vassal state under Shang, bringing along his family and loyal followers. Huang Feihu receives a warm welcome in Xiqi and is treated with respect. His title is changed to "Prince Wucheng Who Founds the Kingdom" (開國武成王).

After the death of Ji Chang (Western Duke and lord of Xiqi), his son Ji Fa (later King Wu of Zhou) leads a campaign to overthrow King Zhou of Shang. Huang Feihu dedicates the rest of his life to assisting Ji Fa in toppling the Shang Dynasty, participating in various battles against Shang. He is eventually killed in a battle at Mianchi (澠池; present-day Mianchi County, Henan) against the Shang general Zhang Kui (張奎).

At the end of the novel, Jiang Ziya grants Huang Feihu the post of "Dongyue Taishan Tianqi Rensheng Dadi" (東嶽泰山天齊仁聖大帝), the leader of the rulers of the Five Sacred Mountains. Huang Feihu oversees the fortunes and fates of mortals and the Eighteen Levels of Hell.

Translation of title 
Dongyue Taishan Tianqi Rensheng Dadi roughly translates to The Equal to Heaven, Benevolent and Sacred Great Emperor of the Eastern Summit Mount Tai.

Family and associates 
Father: Huang Gun (黃滾)
Spouse: Lady Jia (賈氏)
Siblings:
Huang Feibiao (黃飛彪), younger brother
Huang Feibao (黃飛豹), younger brother
Consort Huang (黃貴妃), younger sister, King Zhou of Shang's concubine
Children:
Huang Tianhua (黃天化), slain by Gao Jineng
Huang Tianlu (黃天祿), slain by Wu Wenhua
Huang Tianjue (黃天爵)
Huang Tianxiang (黃天祥)
Subordinates:
Huang Ming (黃明)
Zhou Ji (周紀)
Long Huan (龍環)
Wu Qian (吳謙)

References 

Xu Zhonglin. Fengshen Bang.

External links 

Investiture of the Gods characters
Chinese gods